Charles Ainslie may refer to:

 Charles Nicholas Ainslie (1856–1929), American entomologist
 Charles Philip de Ainslie (1808–1889), British Army officer
 Ben Ainslie (Charles Benedict Ainslie, born 1977), English competitive sailor